The 1961 College Football All-America team is composed of college football players who were selected as All-Americans by various organizations and writers that chose College Football All-America Teams in 1961. The six selectors recognized by the NCAA as "official" for the 1961 season are (1) the American Football Coaches Association (AFCA), (2) the Associated Press (AP), (3) the Football Writers Association of America (FWAA), (4) the Newspaper Enterprise Association (NEA), (5) the Sporting News, and (6) the United Press International (UPI).

Consensus All-Americans
For the year 1961, the NCAA recognizes six published All-American teams as "official" designations for purposes of its consensus determinations. The following chart identifies the NCAA-recognized consensus All-Americans and displays which first-team designations they received.

All-American selections for 1961

Ends
Gary Collins, Maryland (AFCA, AP-2, FWAA, NEA, SN, UPI-1, CP, Time, WC)
Bill Miller, Miami (Fla.) (AP-1, FWAA, NEA, SN, UPI-2, Time, WC)
Greg Mather, Navy (AP-3, FWAA, UPI-2, CP)
Gary Hillebrand, Colorado (AP-1, FWAA)
Pat Richter, Wisconsin (AP-2, UPI-1)
Robert Mitinger, Penn State (AFCA, UPI-3)
Hugh Campbell, Washington State (AP-3, UPI-3)

Tackles
Billy Neighbors, Alabama  (AFCA, AP-1, FWAA [guard], NEA, SN, UPI-1, CP, WC)
Merlin Olsen, Utah State  (AP-1, FWAA, NEA, UPI-1, Time, WC)
Bobby Bell, Minnesota  (AFCA, AP-3, FWAA, SN, UPI-2, CP)
Ed Blaine, Missouri (AP-2, FWAA)
Don Talbert, Texas (FWAA, UPI-3)
Fate Echols, Northwestern (Time)
Steve Barnett, Oregon (AP-2)
Jim Dunaway, Ole Miss (UPI-2)
Art Gregory, Duke (AP-3)

Guards
Roy Winston, LSU (AFCA, AP-1, FWAA, NEA, SN, UPI-1, CP, Time, WC)
Joe Romig, Colorado  (AFCA, FWAA, NEA, SN, UPI-1, WC)
Dave Behrman, Michigan State (AP-1, FWAA, UPI-3 [tackle])
Nick Buoniconti, Notre Dame (UPI-2, CP)
Bookie Bolin, Mississippi (Time)
Mike Ingram, Ohio State (AP-2, UPI-2)
Dave Watson, Georgia Tech (AP-2)
Stan Sezurek, Purdue (AP-3, UPI-3)
Larry Vignali, Pitt (AP-3, UPI-3)

Centers
Alex Kroll, Rutgers  (AFCA, AP-1, FWAA, NEA, UPI-1, WC)
Bill Van Buren, Iowa (SN, CP)
Ron Hull, UCLA (AP-2, FWAA, UPI-3)
Irv Goode, Kentucky (Time)
Larry Onesti, Northwestern (AP-3, UPI-2)

Quarterbacks
Sandy Stephens, Minnesota (AP-1, FWAA, NEA, SN, UPI-1, WC)
Roman Gabriel, North Carolina State  (AFCA, AP-2, FWAA, UPI-2, Time)
John Hadl, Kansas  (FWAA-1, AP-3, UPI-2)
Doug Elmore, Mississippi (CP)
Eddie Wilson, Arizona (AP-3)

Halfbacks
Ernie Davis, Syracuse  (AFCA, AP-1,FWAA, NEA, SN, UPI-1, CP, Time, WC)
Jimmy Saxton, Texas  (AFCA, AP-1, FWAA, NEA, SN, UPI-1, CP, WC)
Lance Alworth, Arkansas  (AP-2, FWAA, UPI-2)
Ronnie Bull, Baylor (UPI-3, Time)
Pat Trammell, Alabama (AP-2, UPI-2)
Bennie McRae, Michigan (AP-3)
Dave Hoppman, Iowa State (AP-3, UPI-3)

Fullbacks
Bob Ferguson, Ohio State  (AFCA, AP-1, FWAA, NEA, SN, UPI-1, CP, Time, WC)
Billy Ray Adams, Mississippi (AP-2, FWAA, UPI-3)
George Saimes, Michigan State (UPI-3)

Key

Official selectors

Other selectors

See also
 1961 All-Atlantic Coast Conference football team
 1961 All-Big Eight Conference football team
 1961 All-Big Ten Conference football team
 1961 All-Pacific Coast football team
 1961 All-SEC football team
 1961 All-Southwest Conference football team

References

All-America Team
College Football All-America Teams